Buccal bifurcation cyst is an inflammatory odontogenic cyst, of the paradental cysts family, that typically appears in the buccal bifurcation region of the mandibular first molars in the second half of the first decade of life. Infected cysts may be associated with pain.

Management
Although the treatment of the cyst was previously enucleation of the cyst with removal of the involved tooth or enucleation with root-canal treatment, the current management is enucleation with the preservation of the involved tooth. However, recent evidence suggests self-resolution of this type of cyst, thus close observation with meticulous oral hygiene measures can be employed unless the cyst is infected and symptomatic.

References

Cysts of the oral and maxillofacial region